German Angolans are the descendants of German settlers in the nation of Angola.

German immigrants to Portuguese Angola started to appear in the mid-19th century. They took part in the founding and initial growth of the coastal city of Moçâmedes in the 1850s.

More German immigrants came to Angola in the 20th century, with about 1,400 immigrating between 1915 and 1930. After Angolan independence and the subsequent civil war that occurred, most German Angolans left the county for Europe, though some families remain, mainly in the town of Calulo, as well as the capital, Luanda.

Until 1975 there was a German-language school in Benguela called the Deutsche Schule Benguela.

See also
Portuguese Angolans
White Africans
White Namibians
Dorsland Trekkers

References 

Angola
 
Ethnic groups in Angola